Fordbridge is a town and civil parish in the Metropolitan Borough of Solihull, in the West Midlands , England. According to the 2001 census, the parish had a population of 8,749. Fordbridge lies within the historic county of Warwickshire.

Etymology
Fordbridge gets its name from the crossing over the River Cole on Cooks Lane, which was referred to as "Ford Bridge" on 19th century OS maps. This name suggests this site was previously a ford, but eventually a bridge was built on the site of that ford, thus giving the bridge and ultimately the civil parish its name.

Transport

The closest railway station is Marston Green. From there, there are trains to Birmingham International, Birmingham New Street, and stations in Coventry as well as services to London Euston station.

References

External links

Towns in the West Midlands (county)